Anatoly Balchev (Ukrainian Анатолий Маркович Бальчев, born 28 July 1946) is a Russian composer, actor, screenwriter and director.

Life and work
Balchev initially worked as a composer, creating pieces for the cinema and theater, as well as songs for Russian pop stars and releasing albums with his own songs. In the self-written piece The Poets' Café he debuted in 1990 as a director.

In the 1990s he was co-producer of the Russian-American project Cops in Russia, the Russian version of the television show COPS by Fox Television. In 1998 he founded the Apollo Film Studio. His intensive study of film-making practiced in Hollywood enabled him to direct the Russian-American movie Passenger from San Francisco. He has written several screenplays waiting to be filmed.

Filmography (selection)
Высоцкий. Неизвестные страницы (Vysotsky, Unknown Pages), 2017
Пассажир из Сан-Франциско (Passenger from San Francisco), 2014
Vladimir Vysotsky's 80th Birthday

Songs (selection)
Пасхальная (Easter)
Хризантемы (chrysanthemums)
У зим бывают имена (winter have names)
Ялта (Yalta)

References

External links
Anatoly Balchev − KipaJazz on SoundCloud

1946 births
Living people
Ukrainian film score composers
Ukrainian screenwriters
Ukrainian film directors
Ukrainian male actors
Place of birth missing (living people)